Honeysuckle bush may refer to:

A number of species of Lonicera, the honeysuckles, of shrubby habit
North American azaleas such as the piedmont azaleas (Rhododendron canescens and Rhododendron flammeum) and others (e.g. Rhododendron prunifolium)
Rhododendron luteum, the yellow azalea or honeysuckle azalea, native to southeastern Europe and western Asia
Diervilla, three species of shrub also known as bush honeysuckles, native to eastern North America

See also
Bush honeysuckle
Honeysuckle (disambiguation)